Nicola Fontanive (born 25 October 1985) was an Italian professional ice hockey player. He retired in 2017, playing his last season with Sportivi Ghiaccio Cortina in the Alps Hockey League. He is now a personal trainer.

He was named to the Italy national ice hockey team for competition at the 2014 IIHF World Championship.

References

External links

1985 births
Ice hockey players at the 2006 Winter Olympics
Italian ice hockey centres
Living people
Olympic ice hockey players of Italy
People from Belluno
Sportspeople from the Province of Belluno